This is a list of people from Charlottesville, Virginia, or from areas nearby to Charlottesville, who were either born, lived or presently live in the city.

Since the city's early formation, it has been the home of numerous notable individuals, from the historic figures of Thomas Jefferson and James Monroe, as well as author William Faulkner. In the present day, Charlottesville has been the home of movie star Sam Shepard and musician Dave Matthews.

Historic

 Anna Anderson – claimed to be the Grand Duchess Anastasia of Russia; lived out her final years in Charlottesville
 Eva Roberta Coles Boone – African-American educator and missionary to Congo
 Kathleen Clifford – silent film, vaudeville and Broadway stage actress; born in Charlottesville
 Rita Dove – poet and essayist
 Fountain Hughes – former slave interviewed by the Works Progress Administration to record slave narratives
 Nannie Cox Jackson, prominent African American educator, wealthy property owner and businesswoman; likely African American descendant of Thomas Jefferson 
 Thomas Jefferson – third President of the United States (1801–1809); principal author of the Declaration of Independence (1776); one of the most influential Founding Fathers
 Meriwether Lewis – explorer, soldier, and public administrator; best known for his role as the leader of the Corps of Discovery, whose mission was to explore the territory of the Louisiana Purchase
 James Madison – fourth President of the United States
 James Monroe – Founding Father of the United States; fifth President of the United States; lived at Ash Lawn-Highland, adjacent to Jefferson's Monticello
 John Mosby – known as the "Gray Ghost", a Confederate partisan ranger in the American Civil War
 Nicholas Philip Trist – author of the Treaty of Guadalupe Hidalgo, which ended the Mexican War

Authors and academics 
 William Faulkner – writer in residence at the university, to which he bequeathed all of his original manuscripts
 Steven M. Greer – ex-physician best known for founding the Disclosure Project
 Henry Hoke – author of hybrid books
 Julia Magruder – novelist
 William McDonough – environmental architect, planner, author; former dean of architecture at the university
 William McGuffey – lived in Charlottesville while serving as a professor at the university; buried nearby
 Arthur T. Prescott – educator and founding president of Louisiana Tech University, 1894–1899; lived in Charlottesville 1887–1893, as commandant of cadets at the University of Virginia
 Rob Sheffield – author of Love is a Mix Tape, a memoir that takes place in Charlottesville

Musicians 

 Terri Allard
 Don Barnes – member of 38 Special
 Carter Beauford – percussionist (drummer) and founding member of the Dave Matthews Band
 Eli Cook
 Bella Morte
 David Berman – member of Silver Jews
 Paul Curreri
 John D'earth
 Brennan Gilmore
 The Hackensaw Boys
 Schuyler Fisk
 Happy Flowers
 Corey Harris – blues and reggae musician and teacher; winner of a MacArthur Fellowship in 2007
 Greg Howard – Chapman Stick player
 Hush Arbors – folk and experimental guitarist
 Maxine Jones – an original member of the R&B singing group En Vogue
 The Landlords
 Stephen Malkmus – member of Pavement
 Dave Matthews – musician.
 James McNew – member of Yo La Tengo
 LeRoi Moore – saxophonist for the Dave Matthews Band
 Tom Peloso – member of Modest Mouse
 Wendy Repass
 Sparky's Flaw
 Devon Sproule
 Boyd Tinsley – violinist and backup singer for the Dave Matthews Band
 Sarah White

Sports

 Ashby Dunbar, baseball player in the Negro leagues
 Charlie Ferguson – former MLB pitcher for the Philadelphia Phillies
Larry Haney – former Major League Baseball player for the Baltimore Orioles, Seattle Pilots/Milwaukee Brewers, Oakland Athletics and St. Louis Cardinals
Ralph Horween – Harvard Crimson and NFL football player
 Chris Long – graduate of St. Anne's-Belfield School; award-winning football defensive end on the 2007 Virginia Cavaliers football team; drafted 2nd overall by the St. Louis Rams in the 2008 NFL Draft
 Howie Long – father of Chris Long; TV sports personality; former football defensive end for the Oakland Raiders
 Tommy Toms – former Major League Baseball pitcher for the San Francisco Giants, 1975–1977; born in Charlottesville
 Eric Wilson – former NFL football player for the Buffalo Bills and Washington Redskins

Others
 Coran Capshaw – manager for the Dave Matthews Band; real estate developer
 Miriam Cooper – silent film actress; known for her role in The Birth of a Nation; spent her last years here
 Kate Higgins – voice actress, Naruto
 Abby Kasonik – artist
 Khizr and Ghazala Khan – political activists and speaker at 2016 Democratic National Convention
 Wythe Leigh Kinsolving – Episcopal priest, writer, poet, political advocate; lived here in the 1940s through 1964
 John Kluge – businessman and philanthropist; lived in Charlottesville for a number of years and built the Albemarle House
 Robert Llewellyn, Earlysville photographer
 Rob Lowe – Hollywood actor; born in Charlottesville
 Camila Mendes – actress; born in Charlottesville to Brazilian parents
 Halsey Minor – entrepreneur, founded CNET
 Pauline Oberdorfer Minor - one of the founders of Delta Sigma Theta sorority
 Eduardo Montes-Bradley – writer and filmmaker
 Monica Richardson – editor
 Hawes Spencer – editor, founded The Hook
 Alexander Vandegrift – Medal of Honor recipient, first active-duty four-star general in the U.S. Marine Corps

References

Charlottesville
Charlottesville, Virginia